The Lili'uokalani Symphony is Argentine-American composer Lalo Schifrin's First Symphony. Commissioned by her family, it was dedicated to the memory of Queen Liliʻuokalanii, the last Queen of the Kingdom of Hawaii who was also an ecologist and composer who sacrificed her crown in order to save her people.

The symphony premiered in Hawaii by an ad hoc group of musicians from the Hawaii Symphony Orchestra named "The Lili'uokalani Symphony Orchestra" in 1993. The work was then recorded by the Wiener Symphoniker (Vienna Symphony Orchestra) with the Kamehameha Elementary School Children's Chorus and the Hawaii Youth Opera Chorus under the direction of the composer, assisted by choral conductors Nola Nahulu and Lynell Bright.  The album was released on CD on the Urtext Digital Classics label on January 1, 1995 and is also available as a digital download.

Track listing
Symphony #1 (Lili'uokalani) by Lalo Schifrin

 First movement   (17:21)
 Second movement   (13:35)
 Third movement  (7:45)
 Fourth movement  (18:26)

Personnel
Source = 

 Vienna Symphony Orchestra
 Hawaii Youth Opera Chorus
 Kamehameha Elementary School Children's Chorus
 Lalo Schifrin – Composer, conductor, producer, liner notes
 Nola Nahulu – Conductor, Hawaii Youth Opera Chorus
 Lynell Bright – Conductor, Kamehameha Elementary School Children's Chorus
 Neil Hannahs – Executive producer
 Jiri Pospichal, Gustav Soral & Don C. Tyler – Recording engineers
 John Richards – Mixing engineer

References

Lalo Schifrin albums
1995 albums
Albums arranged by Lalo Schifrin
Albums conducted by Lalo Schifrin
Choral symphonies